El Conde: Amor y honor (English: The Count: Love and Honor) is an upcoming American television series that will premiere on Telemundo in 2023. It is an adaption of the 1844 novel The Count of Monte Cristo by Alexandre Dumas, and is produced by Sony Pictures Television for Telemundo. It will star Fernando Colunga and Ana Brenda Contreras.

Cast 
 Fernando Colunga as Alejandro Gaitán / Count Joaquín de Montenegro
 Ana Brenda Contreras as Mariana Zambrano
 Marjorie de Sousa as Cayetana Carrá
 Sergio Sendel as Gerardo Villarreal
 Chantal Andere as Josefina de Zambrano
 Víctor González as Ricardo Sánchez
 Helena Rojo as Guadalupe de Gaitán
 Omar Fierro as Benjamín Zambrano
 Javier Díaz Dueñas as Leopoldo Villarreal
 Manuel Navarro as Amador Guzmán
 Alejandro Ávila as Guillermo "Memo" Garza
 Sergio Reynoso as Alfredo Gallardo
 Erika de la Rosa as Paulina de Zambrano
 Roberto Romano as Felipe Zambrano
 Uriel del Toro as Antonio Rodríguez
 Saraí Meza as Sofía Zambrano
 Mario Loria
 Leticia Perdigón
 Enoc Leaño
 Jason Romo
 Patricia Martínez
 Antonio Fortier
 Jessica Coch
 Xabiani Ponce de León
 Job Huerta
 Annie Cabello
 Lu Rosette

Production

Development 
On 15 February 2022, the series was announced at Telemundo's virtual screening event. In May 2022, the series was presented during Telemundo's upfront for the 2022–2023 television season. Filming of the series began in June 2022 and concluded on 30 September 2022. On 26 January 2023, Telemundo released the first official trailer for the series.

Casting 
On 15 February 2022, Fernando Colunga was announced as the lead role. On 26 May 2022, Ana Brenda Contreras was announced in a main role. On 28 May 2022, Marjorie de Sousa, Omar Fierro, Chantal Andere and Sergio Sendel were announced in main roles. On 13 June 2022, an extensive cast list was published in a press release.

References

External links 
 

Upcoming television series
Television shows based on The Count of Monte Cristo